The FH-88 or Field Howitzer 88 was the first locally designed howitzer developed for the Singapore Army. It is a 155 mm/39-calibre towed howitzer gun.

Development
Ordnance Development and Engineering of Singapore (ODE, now Singapore Technologies Kinetics) began development of the FH-88 in 1983 with five prototypes being produced over a period of four years. These were followed by a preproduction batch of six 155 mm FH-88 gun-howitzers that incorporated a number of improvements as a result of trials with the prototype weapons.

First production FH-88s were completed in 1987, with the weapon becoming operational with the Singapore Army the following year, replacing the Soltam M-71. The howitzer was publicly presented in 1988.

Operators

: Known to use 52 FH-88s.
: Known to have 5 FH-88s delivered in 1997.

See also
FH-2000
SLWH Pegasus
SSPH Primus

References

Bibliography
Hogg, Ian. Twentieth-Century Artillery. New York: Barnes & Noble Books, 2000.  Pg.70

External links
Singapore Army official site

155 mm artillery
Artillery of Singapore